Magadanobracon is an extinct genus of wasps which existed in what is now Russia during the Cenomanian age. It was described by Sergey A. Belokobylskij, and contains the species M. rasnitsyni and M. zherikhini.

References

Prehistoric Hymenoptera genera
Braconidae genera
Protorhyssalinae
Cretaceous insects
Fossils of Russia